The Second Battle of Heligoland Bight, also the Action in the Helgoland Bight and the , was an inconclusive naval engagement fought between British and German squadrons on 17 November 1917 during the First World War.

Background

British minelaying

(During 1917, six U-boats were sunk by British mines and in two years, the German minesweeping counter-effort suffered the loss about 28 destroyers and 70 minesweepers and other ships.)

The Germans had been forced into minesweeping up to  into the Heligoland Bight and in the southern Baltic Sea, covered by light cruisers and destroyers, with occasional distant support by battleships. After the action off Lerwick, several proposals for attacks on the German minesweepers and escorts were canvassed at the Admiralty. On 31 October, the British sent a large force of cruisers and destroyers into the Kattegat, which sank , an armed merchant ship and nine trawlers.

German test trips

The prolific British laying of mines and net barrages outside the main German mine belts between Horns Reef and Terschelling, close to the bases of the High Seas Fleet forced the  into surveying the British minefields, to find routes through them for transit into and back from the North Sea. Test trips were carried out, being substantial operations with ships to find the mines, minesweepers, torpedo boats (usually a continental term for destroyers), U-boats, barrier breakers and light cruisers, with air reconnaissance by Zeppelins and seaplanes. The Test trips were also protected by battleships on routes known to be free of mines.

Prelude

North Sea operations

On 20 October, the British code breakers of Room 40, part of the Naval Intelligence Division of the Admiralty, decrypted orders to the submarine UB-61 to scout to the north of Bergen to find the new route of the Scandinavian Convoy. Agent reports from Copenhagen disclosed an imminent German attack by seven light cruisers and 36 destroyers. During the week ending 11 November, British light cruisers, destroyers and a battlecruiser escort, conducted an abortive sweep along the fringe of the Heligoland Bight minefields. By mid-November the Admiralty had obtained enough intelligence to intercept one of the big German minesweeping operations, provided that the ships based at Rosyth, in Scotland, could sail in time. The Admiralty decided that an offensive operation should begin on 17 November.

Test trip, 17 November

The Germans planned a Test trip for 17 November 1917, comprising the 2nd and 6th Auxiliary Mine Sweeper Half-Flotillas, the 12th and 14th Torpedo Boat Half-Flotillas, Barrier Breaking Division IV and light cruisers of Scouting Group Division II, commanded by Rear-Admiral Ludwig von Reuter from the 6th Mine Sweeper Half-Flotilla. The battleships were to reach a point west of Heligoland by  while the Test trip group rendezvoused in the Heligoland Bight about half-way between Horns Reef and Terschelling. With poor weather grounding Zeppelins and making it impossible for light cruisers embark seaplanes, after they had alighted on the sea, the Test trip relied on reconnaissance patrols by two land-based seaplanes from Borkum on the German coast, just east of the Netherlands, for reconnoitring ahead of the group.

British plan

The German Test trip had been revealed by the code breakers of Room 40, allowing the British to plan an ambush. On 16 November, orders for an attack on the Test trip were sent to Admiral Sir David Beatty, Commander-in-Chief of the British Grand Fleet. On 17 November 1917 a force of cruisers under Vice Admiral Trevylyan Napier was sent to attack the German minesweepers as they were mineweeping.

Battle
She opened fire at  Reuter with four light cruisers and eight destroyers, advanced towards the British ship to cover the withdrawal of the minesweepers which escaped, except for the trawler , which was sunk. A stern chase ensued as the German forces, making skilful use of smoke-screens, withdrew south-east at their best speed, under fire from the 1st Cruiser Squadron, the 1st Light Cruiser Squadron and the 6th Light Cruiser Squadron.  was detached from the 1st Battle Cruiser Squadron and came up at high speed to join the battle. Both sides were hampered in their manoeuvres by the presence of naval minefields.

At about the same time, the light cruisers came under fire from Kaiser and Kaiserin, Kaiser-class battleships, which had come up in support of Reuter's ships;  was struck by a  shell, which damaged a gun turret; shortly afterwards, the British ships gave up the chase as they reached the edge of more minefields. A shell went through the upper conning tower of the light cruiser , killing the conning tower crew and mortally wounding the Captain, Herbert Edwards, on the bridge and knocking unconscious the navigator, Lieutenant-Commander M. F. F. Wilson. All personnel on the lower bridge were killed and the gunner officer, Lieutenant H. C. C. Clarke took command, which was made more difficult because the shell also cut all electrical communications and reduced the rate of fire. The battlecruiser Repulse briefly engaged the German ships at about  achieving a hit on the light cruiser  that started a serious fire.

Aftermath

Analysis

In 1984, Patrick Beesly wrote that the British operation was daring but that Napier was unjustly blamed for its failure to pursue the German ships with sufficient vigour. Room 40 was well informed about the positions of German minefields and the British fields which the Germans were trying to clear. The information had been added to Room 40's naval charts but the information was denied to Napier who made decisions based on the charts he did have. Admiralty reluctance to disclose that their information was derived from the decoding of wireless intercepts had led to the naval commander being ill-informed. The Admiralty did at least supply operational intelligence to the Naval commanders, after Beatty had made an emergency request when he was at sea. At the least, Room 40 had prevented the British operation degenerating from fiasco to disaster.

Casualties

In 1920, Admiral Reinhard Scheer wrote that the Germans suffered casualties of  killed, ten seriously wounded and thirty men slightly wounded. An Admiralty communiqué listed British casualties as one officer and  killed, four officers and  wounded;  were taken.

Victoria Cross
Able Seaman John Carless of Walsall, aboard Commodore Cowan’s flag-ship , was awarded a posthumous Victoria Cross for his bravery in continuing to load and fire his gun despite receiving mortal shrapnel wounds that opened his abdomen.

Orders of battle

British forces

1st Cruiser Squadron
Vice Admiral Trevylyan Napier CB, MVO
  (flag; Capt Arthur Bromley)
  (Capt Charles B. Miller CB)
 Attached destroyers (13th Destroyer Flotilla)
  (Cdr John Tovey)
  (Lt. Cdr. Montague G. B. Legge DSO)
  (Lt Cdr Guy P. Bowles)
  (Lt Cdr Roger V. Alison DSO)

6th Light Cruiser Squadron
Rear Admiral Edwyn Alexander-Sinclair CB MVO
  (flag; Capt. Claud H. Sinclair)
  (Capt. the Hon. Herbert Meade DSO)
  (Capt. Herbert L. Edwards)
  (Capt. William M. Kerr)
 Attached destroyers (13th Destroyer Flotilla)
  (flotilla leader; Cdr. Charles A. Fremantle)
  (Cdr. Dashwood F. Moir)
  (Lt Cdr. Kenneth A. Beattie)
  (Lt. Vernon Hammersley-Heenan)

1st Light Cruiser Squadron
Commodore Walter Cowan CB, MVO, DSO
  (Cdre Cowan)
  (Capt. Charles Forbes DSO)
  (Capt. the Hon. Mathew R. Best MVO, DSO)
  (Capt. Francis A. Marten)
 Attached destroyers (13th Destroyer Flotilla)
  (Cdr. Charles Ramsey)
  (Lt. Cdr. Charles H. Neill James)

1st Battle Cruiser Squadron (detachment)
Rear Admiral Richard Phillimore CB, MVO)
  (flag; Capt. William Boyle)

Other forces at sea in support (none of which engaged)
 Battle Cruiser Force
 Vice Admiral Sir William Pakenham KCB, KCVO)
  (flag), 
 Attached light forces (13th Destroyer Flotilla)
  (flotilla cruiser), .
 1st Battle Squadron
 Admiral Sir Charles Madden
  (flag), 
 Attached destroyers (12th Destroyer Flotilla)
  (flotilla leader),  (flotilla leader), .

German forces

2nd Scouting Group
Konteradmiral Ludwig von Reuter
  (FKpt Karl Feldmann)
  (FKpt Gerhard von Gaudecker)
  (FKpt Otto Seidensticker)
  (KptzS Walther Hildebrand)

7th Torpedo-Boat Flotilla
KKpt Hermann Cordes
 S62 (KptLt Max Fink; flotilla leader)
 G87 (OLtzS Wolfgang Komorowski)
 14th half-flotilla (KptLt Richard Beitzen)
 G92 (KptLt Arthur von Killinger; half-flotilla leader)
 G93 (KptLt Georg Reimer)
 V83 (Kpt Lt Wedig von Keyserlingk)
 12th half-flotilla (KKpt Rudolf Lahs)
 V43 (OLtzS Victor Narjes; half-flotilla leader)
 V44 (OLtzS Eberhard Kautter)
 V45 (KptLt Martin Laßmann)

Minesweepers
 6th Minesweeper Half-Flotilla [6. ] (KptLt d'Ottilié)
 M66, M7, A36, T74, M53, M4, M3, M1
 4th Auxiliary Minesweeper Half-Flotilla [4. ] (KptLt d R Joachim Löwe)
 A63 A68, A69, A74, A41, A52
 2nd Auxiliary Minesweeper Half-Flotilla (KptLt d R Klose)
 fishing vessels
 6th Auxiliary Minesweeper Half-Flotilla (KptLt d R Wilke)
 fishing vessels
 4th Barrier-Breaker Group [IV. ] (KptLt d R Hillebrand)
 two vessels
 Group S, North Sea Outpost Flotilla (LtzS Heinrich Woldag)NO
 armed trawlers Fritz Reuter and KehdingenGE

4th Battle Squadron (detachment)
KptzS Kurt Graßhoff
  (KptzS Kurt Graßhoff)
  (KptzS Max Loesch)
 Attached torpedo-boats (anti-submarine escort)
 S18 (KptLt Wildemann)
 S24 (KptLt Paschen)

Other forces at sea in support (none of which were engaged)
 Battleships: , 
 Battlecruisers: ,

Notes

Footnotes

References

Further reading

External links
 

Conflicts in 1917
Battle 1917
North Sea operations of World War I
Naval battles of World War I involving Germany
Naval battles of World War I involving the United Kingdom
November 1917 events